PNU-99,194(A) (or U-99,194(A)) is a drug which acts as a moderately selective D3 receptor antagonist with ~15-30-fold preference for D3 over the D2 subtype. Though it has substantially greater preference for D3 over D2, the latter receptor does still play some role in its effects, as evidenced by the fact that PNU-99,194 weakly stimulates both prolactin secretion and striatal dopamine synthesis, actions it does not share with the more selective (100-fold) D3 receptor antagonists S-14,297 and GR-103,691.

In rodent studies, low doses of PNU-99,194 produce conditioned place preference (CPP) with no effect on intracranial self-stimulation (ICSS), whereas low doses of D3 agonists like 7-OH-DPAT inhibit ICSS behavior and cause conditioned place aversion (CPA). In contrast, high doses of PNU-99,194 produce CPA and inhibit ICSS, while high doses of 7-OH-DPAT result in the opposite. Paralleling this, low doses of PNU-99,194 and 7-OH-DPAT induce hyperactivity and hypoactivity, respectively, whereas the inverse is seen at high doses with both agents. These data indicate that the D3 receptor has biphasic effects on reward mechanisms and locomotor activity, likely due to opposing roles of autoreceptors versus postsynaptic receptors.

Other effects of PNU-99,194 at low doses in rodents include increased nociceptive responses, hypothermia, anxiolysis, and facilitation of learning and memory, as well as augmentation and inhibition, respectively, of amphetamine-induced reward and behavioral sensitization, and reversal of morphine-induced CPP. At high doses it inhibits the self-administration of cocaine in both rats and monkeys.

See also 
 7-OH-DPAT
 UH-232
 RDS-127

References 

Dopamine antagonists
2-Aminoindanes
Stimulants
Phenol ethers
Propyl compounds